Sir Archie Pellow Marshall (20 November 1899 – 20 June 1966) was a British Liberal Party politician and High Court Judge.

Background
He was the younger son of Alfred Ernest Stanley Marshall, of Roche, Cornwall. He was educated at Truro School, Cornwall and Gonville and Caius College, Cambridge, MA, LLB (Camb.), 1921–25. In 1926 he married Meta Hawke, of Bugle, Cornwall. They had one son and one daughter. In 1959 he was knighted. He was elected a bard of the Cornish Gorseth in 1963, taking the Bardic name Brusyas an Gernewyon (Judge of the Cornish).

Legal career
He was called to Bar and joined the Midland Circuit in 1925. He took silk becoming a King's Counsel in 1947. He became a High Court Judge in 1959. In 1963 he presided over the trial of Dr. Stephen Ward. Geoffrey Robertson, a Queen's Counsel who has written a book on the trial, Stephen Ward was Innocent, OK, says that on more than one significant legal point, Marshall misdirected the jurors. The transcript of his summing up, lodged at the National Archives, has been closed and classified as secret until the year 2046. The case has been described as "a gross miscarriage of justice".

Political career
In 1924 he was President of the Cambridge Union. He was also Chairman of Cambridge University Liberal Club from 1923 to 1924 and a Vice-Chairman of the National League of Young Liberals. He was Chairman of the Union of University Liberal Societies from 1924 to 1925. He was Liberal candidate for the King's Norton Division of Birmingham at the 1929 General Election. 

He was Liberal candidate again for the King's Norton Division at the 1931 General Election. 

In 1939 he was selected as prospective Liberal parliamentary candidate for a General Election expected to take place within a year. He was Liberal candidate for the Hereford Division of Herefordshire at the 1945 General Election.

He was President of the London Cornish Association.

References

External links 
The National Portrait Gallery has portrait of Marshall.

1899 births
1966 deaths
Liberal Party (UK) parliamentary candidates
20th-century English judges
People educated at Truro School
Alumni of Gonville and Caius College, Cambridge
20th-century King's Counsel
Politicians from Cornwall
Presidents of the Cambridge Union
Probate, Divorce and Admiralty Division judges
Bards of Gorsedh Kernow
Knights Bachelor